Pseudolatirus clausicaudatus is a species of sea snail, a marine gastropod mollusk in the family Fasciolariidae, the spindle snails, the tulip snails and their allies.

Description
The size of the shell varies between 25 mm and 56 mm.

Distribution
This marine species occurs off Cape of Good Hope, South Africa.

References

External links
 

Fasciolariidae
Gastropods described in 1844